Yatesville is an unincorporated community in Fayette County, in the U.S. state of Ohio.

History
The community was named after M. L. Yates, founder.  A post office called Yatesville was established in 1888, and remained in operation until 1905. Yatesville had 27 inhabitants in 1910.

References

Unincorporated communities in Fayette County, Ohio
Unincorporated communities in Ohio